Henry Londt (5 December 1879 – 25 August 1947) was a South African cricketer. He played in ten first-class matches from 1903/04 to 1910/11.

References

External links
 

1879 births
1947 deaths
South African cricketers
Border cricketers
Eastern Province cricketers
Cricketers from Cape Town